Malemute is the designation of an American sounding rocket. The Malemute has a maximum flight altitude of 165 km, a liftoff thrust of 57.00 kN, a total mass of 100 kg, a diameter of 0.41 m and a total length of 2.40 m.

External links
Encyclopedia Astronautica Malemute Info

Sounding rockets of the United States
Meteorological instrumentation and equipment